The SECAN SUC-10 Courlis (en: Curlew) was a French high-wing touring monoplane designed and built by Société d'Etudes et de Construction Aéronavales (SECAN), a branch of the automobile company Société des Usines Chaussons. The aircraft had problems with the engine installation and only 144 were built, some without engines and were scrapped.

Development
The Courlis was an all-metal high-wing cantilever monoplane with twin booms supporting a tail unit. It was powered by a 190 hp (142 kW)  Mathis G8R piston engine mounted in the rear fuselage in a pusher configuration. It had a fixed tricycle landing gear and had four seats in the enclosed cabin. The prototype, registered F-WBBF, first flew on 9 May 1946. Production was started and a total of 144 aircraft were completed with a number being exported to South America. Problems with the engine (insufficient power, cooling) resulted in the withdrawal of the engine's type certificate and some airframes were never fitted with an engine and scrapped. The company did test fit the aircraft with a 220 hp (164 kW) Mathis engine but production was ended.

The aircraft flew for some years, owned by French private pilots, but by the mid-1950s, most had been withdrawn from service, with many being stored at Mitry-Mory airfield near Paris.

In 1961 the design was revised as the SUC-11G Super Courlis with a 240 hp (179 kW) Continental O-470M engine, but was abandoned after a prototype was built.

Variants
SUC-10 Courlis
Production variant with a 190hp Mathis G.8R engine, 144 built (not all flown).
SUC-11G Super Courlis
Improved design with a 240hp Continental O-470M engine, only one built.

Aircraft on display
One aircraft is held by the Musée de l'Air et de l'Espace, Le Bourget, Paris, France, but is not currently (2007) on public display.

Specifications (SUC-10 Courlis)

See also

References

Notes

Bibliography

Donald, David, ed. The Complete Encyclopedia of World Aircraft. London: Orbis, 1997. p. 796. .

1940s French civil utility aircraft
High-wing aircraft
Single-engined pusher aircraft
Twin-boom aircraft
Aircraft first flown in 1946